Caladenia lodgeana, commonly known as Lodge's spider orchid, is a species of orchid endemic to a restricted area of the south-west of Western Australia. It has a single, hairy leaf and up to three cream, red and pink flowers and a labellum which lacks the red tip common to many other similar caladenias.

Description 
Flowering occurs from late October to early December.

Taxonomy and naming 
Caladenia lodgeana was first described in 2001 by Stephen Hopper and Andrew Phillip Brown from a specimen collected near Margaret River and the description was published in Nuytsia. The specific epithet (lodgeana) honours the Western Australian orchid enthusiast Harry Lodge.

Distribution and habitat 
Lodge's spider orchid is only known from the area between Margaret River and Augusta in the Warren biogeographic region where it grows in seasonal swamps.

Conservation
Only about 137 mature plants from two populations of C. lodgeana were known in 2008. The species is classified as "Threatened Flora (Declared Rare Flora — Extant)" by the Western Australian Government Department of Parks and Wildlife and is listed as "Critically Endangered" under the Australian Government Environment Protection and Biodiversity Conservation Act 1999. The main threats to the species are inappropriate fire regimes, weed invasion, four-wheel driving, grazing, trampling, picking and continued drying of wetlands due to water extraction and land clearance.

References

lodgeana
Endemic flora of Western Australia
Endemic orchids of Australia
Orchids of Western Australia
Plants described in 2001
Taxa named by Stephen Hopper
Taxa named by Andrew Phillip Brown